Kuruthi is a 2021 Indian Malayalam-language political action thriller film directed by Manu Warrier, written by Anish Pallyal, and produced by Supriya Menon through Prithviraj Productions. It stars an ensemble cast including Roshan Mathew,  Prithviraj Sukumaran, Mamukkoya, Murali Gopy, Shine Tom Chacko and Naslen K. Gafoor. Jakes Bejoy composed the original songs and background score. The film is about how enduring human relations that transcends boundaries struggle to survive trials of hatred and prejudice.

Principal photography lasted about a month from December 2020 to January 2021. Kuruthi was scheduled to be released in theatres on 13 May 2021 but was postponed due to the COVID-19 pandemic. The film was released through Amazon Prime Video on 11 August 2021. This film received positive reviews for the main cast's performances, cinematography and screenplay.

Plot

Ibrahim is a rubber tapping labourer who lives in the lonely mountain ranges and is trying to leave behind memories of a traumatic monsoon landslide in which he lost his daughter and wife. He lives with his father Moosa, and younger brother Rasool. Ibrahim is unaware of Rasool's involvement in terrorism, guided by the supposedly friendly Kareem. A woman named Sumathi also visits them often. Sumathi has a brother Preman who makes a living by climbing trees. One night, an injured cop barges into Ibrahim's house with a prisoner and seeks refuge for the night. He reveals himself as Sathyan, an SI. With him is Vishnu, a murderer who stabbed a Muslim shopkeeper to death after the latter refused to close on the former's order. Vishnu is now being chased by communal factions, to be killed before he reaches stations. They have attacked the convoy and the police will not be able to reach them until next morning. Rasool is visibly enraged at his presence. 

Meanwhile, Sathyan informs the others in the house about the situation and closes every window in the house. He also confiscates everyone's mobile phone and every weapon in the house and finds an old non-functional gun belonging to Moosa Khader, who used it in his time as a personal driver for the Mysore Maharaj. Suma arrives with food and is also told to stay in Ibrahim's home, for the night. While eating, Vishnu and Rasool argue about the morality behind the murder, prompting Sathyan to stop them. After eating, they sleep for some time before Kareem arrives. He engages in conversation with Ibrahim, while Sathyan, Vishnu and Suma hide in the rooms. Ibrahim spots a bike key with Kareem and asks whose it is. Kareem names him as Laiq, who comes inside and greets everyone. Laiq tells them that he's from Bangalore and needs to stay there. Laiq asks for food as he's hungry and spots Suma, who lies that she's staying there because of the plumbing problem in her house. Laiq sees through the story and openly asks about the boy. Sathyan, tired of hiding and armed with a pistol, confronts Laiq. Laiq's henchman Umar, arrives and Ibrahim starts to get confused and scared. 

Laiq prepares a handknife from his keychain while Sathyan prepares a gun, both sitting on the opposite ends of a table. Laiq flips the table and stabs Sathyan in the neck, while Umar pushes Ibrahim down. Laiq breaks into the room in which Vishnu and Suma are hiding. Suma holds Laiq at gunpoint with Moosa's gun and accidentally tries to fire it, revealing it's broken nature. Ibrahim quickly grabs Sathyan's gun and drives Laiq, Kareem and Umar out of the house. Sathyan, in his final moments, convinces Ibrahim to promise on the Quran to keep Vishnu safe until the cops from Kenachal arrive the next morning. Ibrahim uncuffs Vishnu as Laiq attacks the window he was cuffed to with an axe. Ibrahim shoots at the window, scaring Laiq away. Umar cuts the power to the house and Suma lights a matchstick and everyone spot Vishnu and Rasool, the latter with a screwdriver. Suma states that the reason behind Vishnu's murder that the temple that Vishnu grew up in was destroyed, prompting him to take revenge. When Ibrahim asks Suma how she knows this, she reveals that she gave him food on a regular basis because he had nowhere to go. Umar climbs the roof of the house and tries to make his way in, but is knocked down on the other side of the roof by Ibrahim armed with a makeshift explosive. 

Laiq jumps on the roof and fights with Ibrahim, ending with Ibrahim pushing Laiq off the roof but not before Laiq cuts his hand, severely injuring him. Preman returns and is immediately suspicious of Kareem and Laiq. He distracts them and climbs a tree, before knocking down a wasp nest that drives them both away. Meanwhile, a severely disfigured Umar wakes up, and goes to retrieve a jeep. Preman enters Ibrahim's house and is confounded. Ibrahim spots blood in Preman's leg and is shocked to discover that he was bitten by a snake. When looking for a means of transport to get Preman to a hospital, Vishnu offers the bike key of Laiq, who dropped it in an earlier fight. When they prepare to leave, Kareem shows up and starts hitting Preman. He is then fatally shot by Suma, who leaves the house with Preman and Vishnu, with Vishnu driving. Laiq unsuccessfully chases them. Laiq arrives at the house and starts attacking Ibrahim, before being told by Kareem that it was Suma who shot him. Laiq agrees to Moosa offering them to drive into the forest using a shortcut to reach before the trio and intercept them. Umar arrives with the jeep and all of them leave. The forests are scaled by the trio (Vishnu, Suma and Preman) and Laiq's henchmen, with both facing several obstacles. 

Moosa arrives and Laiq and Rasool go out to search for the trio. While looking, Laiq tells his story to Rasool about how his father was a simple, devoted man, who sent Laiq abroad when their organisation was banned. Abroad, Laiq is marginalised and discriminated but remains quiet. When he returns home, he finds his father killed and no one but himself to blame for not acting quicker. Just as Laiq finishes, Rasool notices the bike and alerts Laiq while Ibrahim and Moosa watch from far. Vishnu, having noticed Laiq, pushes Suma and Preman and decides to fight Laiq alone. Laiq jumps at Vishnu, but the latter is able to escape. Laiq orders Moosa to chase them. At a turning, Vishnu falls from the bike. Laiq orders to run him over, but Moosa turns away and alerts Ibrahim to 'drop the genie', a method used by Moosa in his old times to escape officers while stealing sandalwood, a sign to 'drop' the package, to be retrieved later. Ibrahim pushes away Rasool and Laiq jumps with Ibrahim. Moosa crashes the jeep and Kareem and Umar are killed. Vishnu is caught by Ibrahim, who uses him as ransom to rescue Suma, who is caught and held by Laiq at knifepoint. Ibrahim lets Vishnu run and Laiq follows. He is finally able to catch up with him and engages in a fight, breaking Vishnu's leg and hand.

Just as Laiq is about to execute Vishnu, he is stabbed by a remorseful Ibrahim. Laiq stumbles and is stabbed again fatally by Ibrahim. Ibrahim begins to pray for forgiveness and leaves with Vishnu. Rasool arrives and is handed the knife by Laiq (the passing of the hate as told by Moosa earlier) before he dies. Near a rock, Suma ponders the question if everything will be normal again. Moosa replies that even though here, in this secluded hill, they are safe, outside, across the bridge, they are not. Ibrahim lets Vishnu go, leaving him to decide his own fate. Vishnu arrives at the bridge and is confronted by a knife-wielding Rasool where the film ends abruptly, symbolising the religious tensions will continue and hatred will be transferred till mankind's extinction.

Cast
 Roshan Mathew as Ibrahim
 Prithviraj Sukumaran as Laiq
 Mamukkoya as Moosa Khader
 Murali Gopy as S.I. Sathyan
 Shine Tom Chacko as Kareem aka Kammu
 Naslen K. Gafoor as Rasool
 Srindaa as Sumathi
 Manikandan R. Achari as Preman
 Sagar Surya as Vishnu
 Navas Vallikunnu as Umar

Production
Kuruthi marks director Manu Warrier's debut film in Malayalam, who had earlier directed Hindi film Coffee Bloom and have written TV series Yudh (both in 2014). Warrier describes the film as "a socio-political thriller that has got a bit of drama, action and thrilling elements [...] though Prithviraj plays the lead, all other characters have equal importance". The film was written by Anish Pallyal. After several discussions, Prithviraj and his wife Supriya Menon decided to produce the film under their banner Prithviraj Productions.

Principal photography of the film began on 9 December 2020 at Erattupetta, Kottayam district. Abhinandan Ramanujam was the cinematographer. The filming completed on 4 January 2021 in a single schedule which lasted only less than a month. Movie song "Vetta Mrigam" released August 6, by Prithviraj in Instagram.

Release
Kuruthi was scheduled to be released in theatres on 13 May 2021 but was postponed due to the COVID-19 pandemic.
The film was released through Amazon Prime Video on 11 August 2021 as an Onam Release.

Reception

Nirmal Narayanan of International Business Times wrote, "Kuruthi is a masterpiece that is raw, intense, and brilliant." IB Times added, "The film shows how radicalized people are ready to kill anyone to fulfill their spiritual desires, which they call commitment towards God." Baradwaj Rangan of Film Companion South wrote "This cast elevates what could have been a routine thriller into something much larger. Kuruthi is a solid film that shows how you can make big statements even within the confines of genre."

References

External links
 

2021 films
Indian action thriller films
2020s Malayalam-language films
2021 action thriller films
Amazon Prime Video original films
Films scored by Jakes Bejoy